Punjab State Board of Technical Education and Industrial Training is an advisory body for technical education institutions in the Punjab region of India. It was established by the Government of Punjab under The Punjab State Board of Technical Education & Industrial Training 1992 Act.

Origin
In the early days of Independence, India embarked on the development of public infrastructure which would allow rapid industrialisation. Areas of development included transportation, roads, irrigation and power. 
Because of a skills shortage in these areas, technical education was fast tracked. In 1957, the government directed each state to form a technical board called, the "board of technical education and training" under the leadership of the director of public instruction,  the "DPI".

Statute
From 1957 to 1992, the board was a non-statutory body with no direct academic control. The recommendation for increased statutory recognition came from the "All India council for technical education", AICTE, the apex body for technical education in India and an advisory body to the government.  This suggestion was made in order to increase the organisation and quality of technical education. In 1992, after a number of changes, the board became a statutory body.

Governance
Ex officio positions include the chairperson (the honourable minister for technical education) and the secretary (the joint director of the DPI). Members of the board included representatives of universities, industry bodies, the pharmacy council of India, the institution of engineers and the principles of selected polytechnic colleges.

Functions
The board operates in conjunction with the department of technical education. (The department of technical education focuses on administrative and developmental aspects.)
The board itself frames technical education policy.

Syllabi and teaching
The board reviews and revises syllabi for technical education institutions. (This includes syllabi for students in courses at an undergraduate level). The design of syllabi is done with the needs of industry and Indian society in general in mind. The board provides training for teachers and supervises the teaching of its syllabi.  It provides teaching material and makes education material available to students.

Accreditation and assessment
The board inspects and accredits technical education institutions, conducts examinations and awards diplomas and certificates.

Government and other affiliations
The board advises government on the co-ordinated development of technical education below an undergraduate level. It manages funding schemes for technical education.

References

External sources
  State board of technical education and training, Andhra Pradesh, SBETAP website.
 sbtet world

Organizations established in 1984
Vocational education in India
Educational organisations based in India